FK Frýdek-Místek is a football club based in Frýdek-Místek, Czech Republic. It currently plays in the Moravian-Silesian Football League, which is the third tier of Czech football.

History
The club was founded in 1921 as Karlovohutní fotbalový klub. It took part in the 1976–77 Czechoslovak First League. On 1 July 2011, the club became officially known as Městský fotbalový klub Frýdek-Místek, marking a new period in the club's history, having the town of Frýdek-Místek as its main sponsor.

Historical names
 1921 — Karlovohutní fotbalový klub
 1950 — ZJS Železárny Stalingrad
 1954 — Baník Místek
 1958 — TJ Železárny Stalingrad
 1960 — TJ Válcovny plechu Frýdek-Místek
 1991 — FK Válcovny plechu Frýdek-Místek
 2003 — FK Frýdek-Místek
 2004 — Fotbal Frýdek-Místek
 2011 — MFK Frýdek-Místek
 2021 — FK Frýdek-Místek

Past results

1971–1993

1993–present

References

External links

 
Sport in Frýdek-Místek
Football clubs in the Czech Republic
Czechoslovak First League clubs
1921 establishments in Czechoslovakia
Association football clubs established in 1921